Nerissus bicoloratus is a species of leaf beetle of Senegal and Ivory Coast, described by Martin Jacoby in 1901.

References

Eumolpinae
Beetles of Africa
Insects of West Africa
Taxa named by Martin Jacoby
Beetles described in 1901